Sarıhacılı (also Saryjaly, Sarigadzhanly and Sarygadzhyly) is a village in the Agdam Rayon of Azerbaijan. 

Now a ghost town in the capital Agdam District of Azerbaijan. Founded in the early 19th century, it grew considerably during the Soviet period and had 28,031 inhabitants by 1989, now to 0 as of 2021.

References 

Populated places in Aghdam District